Leccinum engelianum is a species of bolete fungus in the family Boletaceae. Found in Germany, where it grows in association with European beech (Fagus sylvatica), it was described as new to science by Wolfgang Klofac in 2007.

See also
List of Leccinum species

References

engelianum
Fungi described in 2007
Fungi of Europe